There are about 4,454 species of moth in the Iberian Peninsula. The moths (mostly nocturnal) and butterflies (mostly diurnal) together make up the taxonomic order Lepidoptera.

This is a list of moth species which have been recorded in Portugal, Spain and Gibraltar (together forming the Iberian Peninsula). This list also includes species found on the Balearic Islands.

Adelidae
Adela australis (Heydenreich, 1851)
Adela collicolella Walsingham, 1904
Adela croesella (Scopoli, 1763)
Adela cuprella (Denis & Schiffermüller, 1775)
Adela homalella Staudinger, 1859
Adela mazzolella (Hübner, 1801)
Adela pantherellus (Guenée, 1848)
Adela reaumurella (Linnaeus, 1758)
Adela violella (Denis & Schiffermüller, 1775)
Cauchas fibulella (Denis & Schiffermüller, 1775)
Cauchas rufimitrella (Scopoli, 1763)
Nematopogon adansoniella (Villers, 1789)
Nematopogon metaxella (Hübner, 1813)
Nematopogon robertella (Clerck, 1759)
Nematopogon schwarziellus Zeller, 1839
Nemophora albiciliellus (Staudinger, 1859)
Nemophora barbatellus (Zeller, 1847)
Nemophora cupriacella (Hübner, 1819)
Nemophora degeerella (Linnaeus, 1758)
Nemophora dumerilella (Duponchel, 1839)
Nemophora fasciella (Fabricius, 1775)
Nemophora istrianellus (Heydenreich, 1851)
Nemophora metallica (Poda, 1761)
Nemophora minimella (Denis & Schiffermüller, 1775)
Nemophora prodigellus (Zeller, 1853)
Nemophora raddaella (Hübner, 1793)
Nemophora violellus (Herrich-Schäffer in Stainton, 1851)

Alucitidae
Alucita cancellata (Meyrick, 1908)
Alucita cymatodactyla Zeller, 1852
Alucita debilella Scholz & Jackh, 1994
Alucita desmodactyla Zeller, 1847
Alucita grammodactyla Zeller, 1841
Alucita hexadactyla Linnaeus, 1758
Alucita huebneri Wallengren, 1859
Alucita iberica Scholz & Jackh, 1994
Alucita palodactyla Zeller, 1847
Alucita zonodactyla Zeller, 1847

Argyresthiidae
Argyresthia albistria (Haworth, 1828)
Argyresthia bonnetella (Linnaeus, 1758)
Argyresthia brockeella (Hübner, 1813)
Argyresthia conjugella Zeller, 1839
Argyresthia glaucinella Zeller, 1839
Argyresthia goedartella (Linnaeus, 1758)
Argyresthia pruniella (Clerck, 1759)
Argyresthia pygmaeella (Denis & Schiffermüller, 1775)
Argyresthia retinella Zeller, 1839
Argyresthia semifusca (Haworth, 1828)
Argyresthia spinosella Stainton, 1849
Argyresthia arceuthina Zeller, 1839
Argyresthia illuminatella Zeller, 1839
Argyresthia perezi Vives, 2001
Argyresthia praecocella Zeller, 1839
Argyresthia trifasciata Staudinger, 1871

Autostichidae
Apatema baixerasi Vives, 2001
Apatema mediopallidum Walsingham, 1900
Apatema parodia (Gozmány, 1988)
Apateona hispanicum Gozmány, 1985
Aprominta cryptogamarum (Milliere, 1872)
Arragonia kautzi (Rebel, 1928)
Arragonia punctivitella (Zerny, 1927)
Catasphalma kautziella (Rebel, 1935)
Donaspastus digitatus Gozmány, 1985
Dysspastus fallax (Gozmány, 1961)
Heringita heringi Agenjo, 1953
Hesperesta alicantella Derra, 2008
Hesperesta geminella (Chrétien, 1915)
Holcopogon bubulcellus (Staudinger, 1859)
Holcopogon glaserorum Gozmány, 1985
Metaxitagma connivens Gozmány, 1985
Metaxitagma monotona Gozmány, 2008
Oegoconia caradjai Popescu-Gorj & Capuse, 1965
Oegoconia deauratella (Herrich-Schäffer, 1854)
Oegoconia huemeri Sutter, 2007
Oegoconia novimundi (Busck, 1915)
Oegoconia quadripuncta (Haworth, 1828)
Orpecacantha burmanni (Gozmány, 1962)
Orpecovalva diadema Gozmány, 1977
Orpecovalva glaseri Gozmány, 1977
Orpecovalva mallorcae Gozmány, 1975
Stibaromacha ratella (Herrich-Schäffer, 1854)
Symmoca alhambrella Walsingham, 1911
Symmoca degregorioi Requena, 2007
Symmoca dodecatella Staudinger, 1859
Symmoca hendrikseni Gozmány, 1996
Symmoca mimetica Gozmány, 2008
Symmoca nigromaculella Ragonot, 1875
Symmoca oenophila Staudinger, 1871
Symmoca orphnella Rebel, 1893
Symmoca perobscurata Gozmány, 1957
Symmoca petrogenes Walsingham, 1907
Symmoca ponerias Walsingham, 1905
Symmoca pyrenaica Gozmány, 1985
Symmoca revoluta Gozmány, 1985
Symmoca sattleri Gozmány, 1962
Symmoca senora Gozmány, 1977
Symmoca serrata Gozmány, 1985
Symmoca signatella Herrich-Schäffer, 1854
Symmoca signella (Hübner, 1796)
Symmoca simulans Gozmány, 1985
Symmoca sorrisa Gozmány, 1975
Symmoca suffumata Gozmány, 1996
Symmoca sultan Gozmány, 1962
Symmoca tofosella Rebel, 1893
Symmoca uniformella Rebel, 1900
Symmocoides don (Gozmány, 1963)
Symmocoides ferreirae Gozmány, 2000
Symmocoides gozmanyi (Amsel, 1959)
Symmocoides marthae (Gozmány, 1957)
Symmocoides oxybiella (Milliere, 1872)

Batrachedridae
Batrachedra parvulipunctella Chrétien, 1915
Batrachedra pinicolella (Zeller, 1839)
Batrachedra praeangusta (Haworth, 1828)

Bedelliidae
Bedellia ehikella Szocs, 1967
Bedellia somnulentella (Zeller, 1847)

Blastobasidae
Blastobasis decolorella (Wollaston, 1858)
Blastobasis lavernella Walsingham, 1894
Blastobasis magna Amsel, 1952
Blastobasis marmorosella (Wollaston, 1858)
Blastobasis maroccanella Amsel, 1952
Blastobasis phycidella (Zeller, 1839)
Hypatopa ibericella Sinev, 2007
Hypatopa inunctella Zeller, 1839
Tecmerium anthophaga (Staudinger, 1870)
Tecmerium spermophagia Walsingham, 1907
Zenodochium monopetali Walsingham, 1908
Zenodochium xylophagum Walsingham, 1908

Brachodidae
Brachodes funebris (Feisthamel, 1833)
Brachodes laeta (Staudinger, 1863)
Brachodes nanetta (Oberthur, 1922)
Brachodes powelli (Oberthur, 1922)

Brahmaeidae
Lemonia dumi (Linnaeus, 1761)
Lemonia philopalus (Donzel, 1842)

Bucculatricidae
Bucculatrix alaternella Constant, 1890
Bucculatrix andalusica Deschka, 1980
Bucculatrix artemisiella Herrich-Schäffer, 1855
Bucculatrix bechsteinella (Bechstein & Scharfenberg, 1805)
Bucculatrix cantabricella Chrétien, 1898
Bucculatrix helichrysella Constant, 1889
Bucculatrix herbalbella Chrétien, 1915
Bucculatrix maritima Stainton, 1851
Bucculatrix myricae Ragonot, 1879
Bucculatrix nigricomella (Zeller, 1839)
Bucculatrix phagnalella Walsingham, 1908
Bucculatrix pseudosylvella Rebel, 1941
Bucculatrix santolinella Walsingham, 1898

Carposinidae
Carposina berberidella Herrich-Schäffer, 1854

Castniidae
Paysandisia archon (Burmeister, 1880)

Chimabachidae
Dasystoma salicella (Hübner, 1796)
Diurnea fagella (Denis & Schiffermüller, 1775)
Diurnea lipsiella (Denis & Schiffermüller, 1775)

Choreutidae
Anthophila fabriciana (Linnaeus, 1767)
Choreutis nemorana (Hübner, 1799)
Choreutis pariana (Clerck, 1759)
Prochoreutis myllerana (Fabricius, 1794)
Prochoreutis sehestediana (Fabricius, 1776)
Tebenna bjerkandrella (Thunberg, 1784)
Tebenna micalis (Mann, 1857)
Tebenna pretiosana (Duponchel, 1842)

Cimeliidae
Axia margarita (Hübner, 1813)

Coleophoridae
Augasma aeratella (Zeller, 1839)
Coleophora absinthivora Baldizzone, 1990
Coleophora achaenivora Hofmann, 1877
Coleophora acrisella Milliere, 1872
Coleophora acutiphaga Baldizzone, 1982
Coleophora adelogrammella Zeller, 1849
Coleophora adjectella Hering, 1937
Coleophora aestuariella Bradley, 1984
Coleophora afrohispana Baldizzone, 1982
Coleophora afrosarda Baldizzone & Kaltenbach, 1983
Coleophora agenjoi Toll, 1960
Coleophora agilis Baldizzone, 1998
Coleophora agnatella Toll, 1960
Coleophora ahenella Heinemann, 1877
Coleophora albarracinica Toll, 1961
Coleophora albella (Thunberg, 1788)
Coleophora albicans Zeller, 1849
Coleophora albicella Constant, 1885
Coleophora albicinctella Toll, 1960
Coleophora albicosta (Haworth, 1828)
Coleophora albicostella (Duponchel, 1842)
Coleophora albidella (Denis & Schiffermüller, 1775)
Coleophora albilineella Toll, 1960
Coleophora albitarsella Zeller, 1849
Coleophora albostraminata Toll, 1960
Coleophora alcyonipennella (Kollar, 1832)
Coleophora alfacarensis Baldizzone, 1998
Coleophora algeriensis Toll, 1952
Coleophora algidella Staudinger, 1857
Coleophora alhamaella Baldizzone, 1980
Coleophora aliena Baldizzone, 1987
Coleophora almeriensis Baldizzone & v.d. Wolf, 1999
Coleophora alticolella Zeller, 1849
Coleophora amethystinella Ragonot, 1855
Coleophora anatipenella (Hübner, 1796)
Coleophora anitella Baldizzone, 1985
Coleophora arctostaphyli Meder, 1934
Coleophora arefactella Staudinger, 1859
Coleophora argenteonivea Walsingham, 1907
Coleophora argentula (Stephens, 1834)
Coleophora asthenella Constant, 1893
Coleophora astragalella Zeller, 1849
Coleophora auricella (Fabricius, 1794)
Coleophora autumnella (Duponchel, 1843)
Coleophora badiipennella (Duponchel, 1843)
Coleophora ballotella (Fischer v. Röslerstamm, 1839)
Coleophora bazae Glaser, 1978
Coleophora berbera Baldizzone, 1988
Coleophora berlandella Toll, 1956
Coleophora beticella Baldizzone, 1987
Coleophora betulella Heinemann, 1877
Coleophora bifrondella Walsingham, 1891
Coleophora bilineatella Zeller, 1849
Coleophora bilineella Herrich-Schäffer, 1855
Coleophora binderella (Kollar, 1832)
Coleophora binotapennella (Duponchel, 1843)
Coleophora biseriatella Staudinger, 1859
Coleophora brunneosignata Toll, 1944
Coleophora burmanni Toll, 1952
Coleophora caelebipennella Zeller, 1839
Coleophora caespititiella Zeller, 1839
Coleophora calycotomella Stainton, 1869
Coleophora cartilaginella Christoph, 1872
Coleophora centaureivora Baldizzone, 1998
Coleophora certhiella Baldizzone, 1985
Coleophora chamaedriella Bruand, 1852
Coleophora changaica Reznik, 1975
Coleophora chiclanensis Hering, 1936
Coleophora ciconiella Herrich-Schäffer, 1855
Coleophora ciliataephaga Glaser, 1978
Coleophora cogitata Baldizzone, 1998
Coleophora colutella (Fabricius, 1794)
Coleophora congeriella Staudinger, 1859
Coleophora conspicuella Zeller, 1849
Coleophora conyzae Zeller, 1868
Coleophora coronillae Zeller, 1849
Coleophora corsicella Walsingham, 1898
Coleophora corticosa Baldizzone & v.d. Wolf, 1999
Coleophora cracella (Vallot, 1835)
Coleophora crepidinella Zeller, 1847
Coleophora cyrniella Rebel, 1926
Coleophora deauratella Lienig & Zeller, 1846
Coleophora derrai Baldizzone, 1985
Coleophora deviella Zeller, 1847
Coleophora dianthi Herrich-Schäffer, 1855
Coleophora dianthivora Walsingham, 1901
Coleophora dignella Toll, 1961
Coleophora diluta Baldizzone & v.d. Wolf, 1999
Coleophora discordella Zeller, 1849
Coleophora dissona Baldizzone, 1998
Coleophora ditella Zeller, 1849
Coleophora dubiella Baker, 1888
Coleophora epijudaica Amsel, 1935
Coleophora eupepla Gozmány, 1954
Coleophora eupreta Walsingham, 1907
Coleophora feoleuca Baldizzone, 1989
Coleophora festivella Toll, 1952
Coleophora fiorii Toll, 1954
Coleophora flaviella Mann, 1857
Coleophora flavipennella (Duponchel, 1843)
Coleophora follicularis (Vallot, 1802)
Coleophora fretella Zeller, 1847
Coleophora frischella (Linnaeus, 1758)
Coleophora fuliginosa Baldizzone, 1998
Coleophora galbulipennella Zeller, 1838
Coleophora gaviaepennella Toll, 1952
Coleophora genistae Stainton, 1857
Coleophora gielisi Baldizzone, 1985
Coleophora glaucicolella Wood, 1892
Coleophora granulatella Zeller, 1849
Coleophora gredosella Baldizzone, 1985
Coleophora griseomixta Toll, 1960
Coleophora gryphipennella (Hübner, 1796)
Coleophora guadicensis Baldizzone, 1989
Coleophora hackmani (Toll, 1953)
Coleophora helianthemella Milliere, 1870
Coleophora helichrysiella Krone, 1909
Coleophora hiberica Baldizzone, 1985
Coleophora hieronella Zeller, 1849
Coleophora horatioella (Agenjo, 1952)
Coleophora hospitiella Chrétien, 1915
Coleophora hyssopi Toll, 1961
Coleophora ibipennella Zeller, 1849
Coleophora ignotella Toll, 1944
Coleophora infolliculella Chrétien, 1915
Coleophora insulicola Toll, 1942
Coleophora internitens Baldizzone & v.d. Wolf, 1999
Coleophora inusitatella Caradja, 1920
Coleophora involucrella Chrétien, 1905
Coleophora iperspinata Baldizzone & Nel, 2003
Coleophora isomoera Falkovitsh, 1972
Coleophora jerusalemella Toll, 1942
Coleophora juncicolella Stainton, 1851
Coleophora jynxella Baldizzone, 1987
Coleophora kahaourella Toll, 1956
Coleophora kautzi Rebel, 1933
Coleophora korbi Baldizzone, 1998
Coleophora kuehnella (Goeze, 1783)
Coleophora lassella Staudinger, 1859
Coleophora lebedella Falkovitsh, 1982
Coleophora leonensis Baldizzone & v.d. Wolf, 2000
Coleophora lineata Toll, 1960
Coleophora lineolea (Haworth, 1828)
Coleophora lixella Zeller, 1849
Coleophora lusitanica Baldizzone & Corley, 2004
Coleophora lutatiella Staudinger, 1859
Coleophora luteochrella Baldizzone & Tabell, 2009
Coleophora luteolella Staudinger, 1880
Coleophora lutipennella (Zeller, 1838)
Coleophora macrobiella Constant, 1885
Coleophora maritimella Newman, 1863
Coleophora mausolella Chrétien, 1908
Coleophora mayrella (Hübner, 1813)
Coleophora medelichensis Krone, 1908
Coleophora mediterranea Baldizzone, 1990
Coleophora mendica Baldizzone & v.d. Wolf, 2000
Coleophora microalbella Amsel, 1935
Coleophora micronotella Toll, 1956
Coleophora milvipennis Zeller, 1839
Coleophora minipalpella Baldizzone, 1998
Coleophora monteiroi Toll, 1961
Coleophora murciana Toll, 1960
Coleophora nevadella Baldizzone, 1985
Coleophora niveicostella Zeller, 1839
Coleophora nutantella Muhlig & Frey, 1857
Coleophora obtectella Zeller, 1849
Coleophora occasi Baldizzone & v.d. Wolf, 1999
Coleophora ochrea (Haworth, 1828)
Coleophora odorariella Muhlig, 1857
Coleophora ononidella Milliere, 1879
Coleophora oriolella Zeller, 1849
Coleophora ortneri Glaser, 1981
Coleophora otidipennella (Hübner, 1817)
Coleophora partitella Zeller, 1849
Coleophora pellicornella Zerny, 1930
Coleophora pennella (Denis & Schiffermüller, 1775)
Coleophora peribenanderi Toll, 1943
Coleophora perplexella Toll, 1960
Coleophora plicipunctella Chrétien, 1915
Coleophora preisseckeri Toll, 1942
Coleophora pterosparti Mendes, 1910
Coleophora punctulatella Zeller, 1849
Coleophora pyrenaica Baldizzone, 1980
Coleophora pyrrhulipennella Zeller, 1839
Coleophora ravillella Toll, 1961
Coleophora retifera Meyrick, 1922
Coleophora ribasella Baldizzone, 1982
Coleophora riffelensis Rebel, 1913
Coleophora rudella Toll, 1944
Coleophora salicorniae Heinemann & Wocke, 1877
Coleophora salinella Stainton, 1859
Coleophora santolinella Constant, 1890
Coleophora saponariella Heeger, 1848
Coleophora saxicolella (Duponchel, 1843)
Coleophora scabrida Toll, 1959
Coleophora schmidti Toll, 1960
Coleophora semicinerea Staudinger, 1859
Coleophora sergiella Falkovitsh, 1979
Coleophora serinipennella Christoph, 1872
Coleophora serpylletorum Hering, 1889
Coleophora serratella (Linnaeus, 1761)
Coleophora siccifolia Stainton, 1856
Coleophora sisteronica Toll, 1961
Coleophora sodae Baldizzone & Nel, 1993
Coleophora solenella Staudinger, 1859
Coleophora solidaginella Staudinger, 1859
Coleophora soriaella Baldizzone, 1980
Coleophora spinella (Schrank, 1802)
Coleophora spumosella Staudinger, 1859
Coleophora staehelinella Walsingham, 1891
Coleophora sternipennella (Zetterstedt, 1839)
Coleophora striatipennella Nylander in Tengstrom, 1848
Coleophora strigosella Toll, 1960
Coleophora striolatella Zeller, 1849
Coleophora struella Staudinger, 1859
Coleophora strutiella Glaser, 1975
Coleophora supinella Ortner, 1949
Coleophora taeniipennella Herrich-Schäffer, 1855
Coleophora tamesis Waters, 1929
Coleophora tanaceti Muhlig, 1865
Coleophora tanitella Baldizzone, 1982
Coleophora taygeti Baldizzone, 1983
Coleophora therinella Tengstrom, 1848
Coleophora traugotti Baldizzone, 1985
Coleophora treskaensis Toll & Amsel, 1967
Coleophora trichopterella Baldizzone, 1985
Coleophora tridentifera Baldizzone, 1985
Coleophora trifariella Zeller, 1849
Coleophora trifolii (Curtis, 1832)
Coleophora trigeminella Fuchs, 1881
Coleophora trochilella (Duponchel, 1843)
Coleophora turbatella Toll, 1944
Coleophora turolella Zerny, 1927
Coleophora unipunctella Zeller, 1849
Coleophora uralensis Toll, 1961
Coleophora valesianella Zeller, 1849
Coleophora vanderwolfi Baldizzone, 1985
Coleophora varensis Baldizzone & Nel, 1993
Coleophora ventadelsolella Glaser, 1981
Coleophora vermiculatella Glaser, 1975
Coleophora versurella Zeller, 1849
Coleophora vestalella Staudinger, 1859
Coleophora vestianella (Linnaeus, 1758)
Coleophora vibicella (Hübner, 1813)
Coleophora vibicigerella Zeller, 1839
Coleophora vicinella Zeller, 1849
Coleophora virgaureae Stainton, 1857
Coleophora vivesella Baldizzone, 1987
Coleophora vulnerariae Zeller, 1839
Coleophora vulpecula Zeller, 1849
Coleophora wockeella Zeller, 1849
Coleophora wolschrijni Baldizzone & v.d. Wolf, 2000
Coleophora zelleriella Heinemann, 1854
Coleophora zernyi Toll, 1944
Goniodoma auroguttella (Fischer v. Röslerstamm, 1841)
Goniodoma limoniella (Stainton, 1884)
Ischnophanes aquilina Baldizzone & v.d. Wolf, 2003
Ischnophanes baldizzonella Vives, 1983
Ischnophanes excentra Baldizzone & v.d. Wolf, 2003
Metriotes jaeckhi Baldizzone, 1985

Cosmopterigidae
Alloclita recisella Staudinger, 1859
Anatrachyntis badia (Hodges, 1962)
Anatrachyntis simplex (Walsingham, 1891)
Ascalenia vanella (Frey, 1860)
Bifascia nigralbella (Chrétien, 1915)
Coccidiphila danilevskyi Sinev, 1997
Coccidiphila gerasimovi Danilevsky, 1950
Cosmopterix athesiae Huemer & Koster, 2006
Cosmopterix coryphaea Walsingham, 1908
Cosmopterix crassicervicella Chrétien, 1896
Cosmopterix lienigiella Zeller, 1846
Cosmopterix orichalcea Stainton, 1861
Cosmopterix pararufella Riedl, 1976
Cosmopterix pulchrimella Chambers, 1875
Cosmopterix schmidiella Frey, 1856
Cosmopterix scribaiella Zeller, 1850
Cosmopterix zieglerella (Hübner, 1810)
Eteobalea albiapicella (Duponchel, 1843)
Eteobalea alypella (Klimesch, 1946)
Eteobalea anonymella (Riedl, 1965)
Eteobalea beata (Walsingham, 1907)
Eteobalea dohrnii (Zeller, 1847)
Eteobalea intermediella (Riedl, 1966)
Eteobalea isabellella (O. G. Costa, 1836)
Eteobalea serratella (Treitschke, 1833)
Eteobalea sumptuosella (Lederer, 1855)
Eteobalea teucrii (Walsingham, 1907)
Gisilia stereodoxa (Meyrick, 1925)
Isidiella divitella (Constant, 1885)
Isidiella nickerlii (Nickerl, 1864)
Limnaecia phragmitella Stainton, 1851
Pancalia leuwenhoekella (Linnaeus, 1761)
Pancalia nodosella (Bruand, 1851)
Pancalia schwarzella (Fabricius, 1798)
Pyroderces argyrogrammos (Zeller, 1847)
Pyroderces caesaris Gozmány, 1957
Pyroderces klimeschi Rebel, 1938
Pyroderces tethysella Koster & Sinev, 2003
Pyroderces wolschrijni Koster & Sinev, 2003
Ramphis ibericus Riedl, 1969
Sorhagenia janiszewskae Riedl, 1962
Sorhagenia lophyrella (Douglas, 1846)
Sorhagenia rhamniella (Zeller, 1839)
Vulcaniella extremella (Wocke, 1871)
Vulcaniella fiordalisa (Petry, 1904)
Vulcaniella gielisi Koster & Sinev, 2003
Vulcaniella grabowiella (Staudinger, 1859)
Vulcaniella pomposella (Zeller, 1839)
Vulcaniella rosmarinella (Walsingham, 1891)

Cossidae
Acossus terebra (Denis & Schiffermüller, 1775)
Cossus cossus (Linnaeus, 1758)
Dyspessa foeda (Swinhoe, 1899)
Dyspessa ulula (Borkhausen, 1790)
Parahypopta caestrum (Hübner, 1808)
Phragmataecia castaneae (Hübner, 1790)
Stygia australis Latreille, 1804
Wiltshirocossus aries (Pungeler, 1902)
Zeuzera pyrina (Linnaeus, 1761)

Crambidae
Acentria ephemerella (Denis & Schiffermüller, 1775)
Achyra murcialis (Ragonot, 1895)
Achyra nudalis (Hübner, 1796)
Agriphila argentistrigellus (Ragonot, 1888)
Agriphila brioniellus (Zerny, 1914)
Agriphila cyrenaicellus (Ragonot, 1887)
Agriphila dalmatinellus (Hampson, 1900)
Agriphila deliella (Hübner, 1813)
Agriphila geniculea (Haworth, 1811)
Agriphila inquinatella (Denis & Schiffermüller, 1775)
Agriphila latistria (Haworth, 1811)
Agriphila selasella (Hübner, 1813)
Agriphila straminella (Denis & Schiffermüller, 1775)
Agriphila tersellus (Lederer, 1855)
Agriphila trabeatellus (Herrich-Schäffer, 1848)
Agriphila tristella (Denis & Schiffermüller, 1775)
Agrotera nemoralis (Scopoli, 1763)
Anania coronata (Hufnagel, 1767)
Anania crocealis (Hübner, 1796)
Anania funebris (Strom, 1768)
Anania fuscalis (Denis & Schiffermüller, 1775)
Anania hortulata (Linnaeus, 1758)
Anania lancealis (Denis & Schiffermüller, 1775)
Anania stachydalis (Germar, 1821)
Anania terrealis (Treitschke, 1829)
Anania testacealis (Zeller, 1847)
Anania verbascalis (Denis & Schiffermüller, 1775)
Anarpia incertalis (Duponchel, 1832)
Ancylolomia disparalis Hübner, 1825
Ancylolomia inornata Staudinger, 1870
Ancylolomia palpella (Denis & Schiffermüller, 1775)
Ancylolomia tentaculella (Hübner, 1796)
Ancylolomia tripolitella Rebel, 1909
Angustalius malacellus (Duponchel, 1836)
Antigastra catalaunalis (Duponchel, 1833)
Aporodes floralis (Hübner, 1809)
Arnia nervosalis Guenée, 1849
Atralata albofascialis (Treitschke, 1829)
Calamotropha fuscilineatellus (D. Lucas, 1938)
Calamotropha paludella (Hübner, 1824)
Cataclysta lemnata (Linnaeus, 1758)
Cataonia erubescens (Christoph, 1877)
Catoptria bolivari (Agenjo, 1947)
Catoptria digitellus (Herrich-Schäffer, 1849)
Catoptria dimorphellus (Staudinger, 1882)
Catoptria falsella (Denis & Schiffermüller, 1775)
Catoptria fulgidella (Hübner, 1813)
Catoptria lythargyrella (Hübner, 1796)
Catoptria mytilella (Hübner, 1805)
Catoptria permutatellus (Herrich-Schäffer, 1848)
Catoptria petrificella (Hübner, 1796)
Catoptria pinella (Linnaeus, 1758)
Catoptria staudingeri (Zeller, 1863)
Chilo agamemnon Błeszyński, 1962
Chilo luteellus (Motschulsky, 1866)
Chilo phragmitella (Hübner, 1805)
Chilo suppressalis (Walker, 1863)
Cholius luteolaris (Scopoli, 1772)
Chrysocrambus craterella (Scopoli, 1763)
Chrysocrambus dentuellus (Pierce & Metcalfe, 1938)
Chrysocrambus linetella (Fabricius, 1781)
Chrysocrambus sardiniellus (Turati, 1911)
Chrysoteuchia culmella (Linnaeus, 1758)
Cornifrons ulceratalis Lederer, 1858
Crambus lathoniellus (Zincken, 1817)
Crambus pascuella (Linnaeus, 1758)
Crambus perlella (Scopoli, 1763)
Crambus uliginosellus Zeller, 1850
Cynaeda dentalis (Denis & Schiffermüller, 1775)
Diasemia reticularis (Linnaeus, 1761)
Diasemiopsis ramburialis (Duponchel, 1834)
Diplopseustis perieresalis (Walker, 1859)
Dolicharthria aetnaealis (Duponchel, 1833)
Dolicharthria bruguieralis (Duponchel, 1833)
Dolicharthria daralis (Chrétien, 1911)
Dolicharthria punctalis (Denis & Schiffermüller, 1775)
Donacaula forficella (Thunberg, 1794)
Duponchelia fovealis Zeller, 1847
Ecpyrrhorrhoe diffusalis (Guenée, 1854)
Ecpyrrhorrhoe rubiginalis (Hübner, 1796)
Elophila feili Speidel, 2002
Elophila nymphaeata (Linnaeus, 1758)
Emprepes pudicalis (Duponchel, 1832)
Epascestria pustulalis (Hübner, 1823)
Euchromius anapiellus (Zeller, 1847)
Euchromius bella (Hübner, 1796)
Euchromius cambridgei (Zeller, 1867)
Euchromius gozmanyi Błeszyński, 1961
Euchromius gratiosella (Caradja, 1910)
Euchromius ocellea (Haworth, 1811)
Euchromius ramburiellus (Duponchel, 1836)
Euchromius rayatellus (Amsel, 1949)
Euchromius superbellus (Zeller, 1849)
Euchromius vinculellus (Zeller, 1847)
Euclasta varii Popescu-Gorj & Constantinescu, 1973
Eudonia angustea (Curtis, 1827)
Eudonia delunella (Stainton, 1849)
Eudonia lacustrata (Panzer, 1804)
Eudonia lineola (Curtis, 1827)
Eudonia mercurella (Linnaeus, 1758)
Eudonia murana (Curtis, 1827)
Eudonia pallida (Curtis, 1827)
Eudonia petrophila (Standfuss, 1848)
Eudonia phaeoleuca (Zeller, 1846)
Eudonia sudetica (Zeller, 1839)
Eudonia truncicolella (Stainton, 1849)
Eurrhypis guttulalis (Herrich-Schäffer, 1848)
Eurrhypis pollinalis (Denis & Schiffermüller, 1775)
Evergestis aenealis (Denis & Schiffermüller, 1775)
Evergestis alborivulalis (Eversmann, 1844)
Evergestis desertalis (Hübner, 1813)
Evergestis dumerlei Leraut, 2003
Evergestis dusmeti Agenjo, 1955
Evergestis extimalis (Scopoli, 1763)
Evergestis forficalis (Linnaeus, 1758)
Evergestis frumentalis (Linnaeus, 1761)
Evergestis isatidalis (Duponchel, 1833)
Evergestis limbata (Linnaeus, 1767)
Evergestis lupalis Zerny, 1928
Evergestis marionalis Leraut, 2003
Evergestis marocana (D. Lucas, 1856)
Evergestis merceti Agenjo, 1933
Evergestis mundalis (Guenée, 1854)
Evergestis pallidata (Hufnagel, 1767)
Evergestis pechi (Bethune-Baker, 1885)
Evergestis plumbofascialis (Ragonot, 1894)
Evergestis politalis (Denis & Schiffermüller, 1775)
Evergestis sophialis (Fabricius, 1787)
Evergestis umbrosalis (Fischer v. Röslerstamm, 1842)
Friedlanderia cicatricella (Hübner, 1824)
Heliothela wulfeniana (Scopoli, 1763)
Hellula undalis (Fabricius, 1781)
Herpetogramma licarsisalis (Walker, 1859)
Hodebertia testalis (Fabricius, 1794)
Hydriris ornatalis (Duponchel, 1832)
Hyperlais cruzae (Agenjo, 1953)
Hyperlais glyceralis (Staudinger, 1859)
Hyperlais nemausalis (Duponchel, 1834)
Hyperlais rivasalis (Vazquez, 1905)
Hyperlais siccalis Guenée, 1854
Loxostege aeruginalis (Hübner, 1796)
Loxostege comptalis (Freyer, 1848)
Loxostege fascialis (Hübner, 1796)
Loxostege manualis (Geyer, 1832)
Loxostege scutalis (Hübner, 1813)
Loxostege sticticalis (Linnaeus, 1761)
Loxostege tesselalis (Guenée, 1854)
Mecyna andalusica (Staudinger, 1879)
Mecyna asinalis (Hübner, 1819)
Mecyna auralis (Peyerimhoff, 1872)
Mecyna flavalis (Denis & Schiffermüller, 1775)
Mecyna lutealis (Duponchel, 1833)
Mecyna trinalis (Denis & Schiffermüller, 1775)
Mesocrambus candiellus (Herrich-Schäffer, 1848)
Metacrambus carectellus (Zeller, 1847)
Metacrambus marabut Błeszyński, 1965
Metacrambus pallidellus (Duponchel, 1836)
Metacrambus salahinellus (Chrétien, 1917)
Metasia carnealis (Treitschke, 1829)
Metasia corsicalis (Duponchel, 1833)
Metasia cuencalis Ragonot, 1894
Metasia hymenalis Guenée, 1854
Metasia ibericalis Ragonot, 1894
Metasia olbienalis Guenée, 1854
Metasia ophialis (Treitschke, 1829)
Metasia suppandalis (Hübner, 1823)
Metaxmeste phrygialis (Hübner, 1796)
Metaxmeste schrankiana (Hochenwarth, 1785)
Nascia cilialis (Hübner, 1796)
Nomophila noctuella (Denis & Schiffermüller, 1775)
Nymphula nitidulata (Hufnagel, 1767)
Orenaia alpestralis (Fabricius, 1787)
Orenaia helveticalis (Herrich-Schäffer, 1851)
Ostrinia nubilalis (Hübner, 1796)
Palepicorsia ustrinalis (Christoph, 1877)
Palpita vitrealis (Rossi, 1794)
Paracorsia repandalis (Denis & Schiffermüller, 1775)
Parapoynx andalusica Speidel, 1982
Parapoynx fluctuosalis (Zeller, 1852)
Parapoynx stagnalis (Zeller, 1852)
Parapoynx stratiotata (Linnaeus, 1758)
Paratalanta hyalinalis (Hübner, 1796)
Paratalanta pandalis (Hübner, 1825)
Pediasia bolivarellus (A. Schmidt, 1930)
Pediasia contaminella (Hübner, 1796)
Pediasia desertellus (Lederer, 1855)
Pediasia hispanica Błeszyński, 1956
Pediasia ribbeellus (Caradja, 1910)
Pediasia serraticornis (Hampson, 1900)
Pediasia siculellus (Duponchel, 1836)
Platytes alpinella (Hübner, 1813)
Platytes cerussella (Denis & Schiffermüller, 1775)
Pleuroptya balteata (Fabricius, 1798)
Pleuroptya ruralis (Scopoli, 1763)
Psammotis pulveralis (Hübner, 1796)
Pseudobissetia terrestrellus (Christoph, 1885)
Pyrausta acontialis (Staudinger, 1859)
Pyrausta aerealis (Hübner, 1793)
Pyrausta aurata (Scopoli, 1763)
Pyrausta castalis Treitschke, 1829
Pyrausta cingulata (Linnaeus, 1758)
Pyrausta coracinalis Leraut, 1982
Pyrausta despicata (Scopoli, 1763)
Pyrausta limbopunctalis (Herrich-Schäffer, 1849)
Pyrausta nigrata (Scopoli, 1763)
Pyrausta obfuscata (Scopoli, 1763)
Pyrausta ostrinalis (Hübner, 1796)
Pyrausta pellicalis (Staudinger, 1871)
Pyrausta porphyralis (Denis & Schiffermüller, 1775)
Pyrausta purpuralis (Linnaeus, 1758)
Pyrausta sanguinalis (Linnaeus, 1767)
Pyrausta virginalis Duponchel, 1832
Sceliodes laisalis (Walker, 1859)
Schoenobius gigantella (Denis & Schiffermüller, 1775)
Scirpophaga praelata (Scopoli, 1763)
Sclerocona acutella (Eversmann, 1842)
Scoparia ambigualis (Treitschke, 1829)
Scoparia basistrigalis Knaggs, 1866
Scoparia gallica Peyerimhoff, 1873
Scoparia ingratella (Zeller, 1846)
Scoparia pyralella (Denis & Schiffermüller, 1775)
Scoparia staudingeralis (Mabille, 1869)
Scoparia subfusca Haworth, 1811
Sitochroa palealis (Denis & Schiffermüller, 1775)
Sitochroa verticalis (Linnaeus, 1758)
Spoladea recurvalis (Fabricius, 1775)
Talis caboensis Asselbergs, 2009
Tegostoma comparalis (Hübner, 1796)
Thisanotia chrysonuchella (Scopoli, 1763)
Thopeutis galleriellus (Ragonot, 1892)
Titanio normalis (Hübner, 1796)
Titanio tarraconensis Leraut & Luquet, 1982
Udea alpinalis (Denis & Schiffermüller, 1775)
Udea austriacalis (Herrich-Schäffer, 1851)
Udea bipunctalis (Herrich-Schäffer, 1851)
Udea conquisitalis (Guenée, 1848)
Udea costalis (Eversmann, 1852)
Udea cyanalis (La Harpe, 1855)
Udea elutalis (Denis & Schiffermüller, 1775)
Udea ferrugalis (Hübner, 1796)
Udea fimbriatralis (Duponchel, 1834)
Udea fulvalis (Hübner, 1809)
Udea institalis (Hübner, 1819)
Udea numeralis (Hübner, 1796)
Udea prunalis (Denis & Schiffermüller, 1775)
Udea rhododendronalis (Duponchel, 1834)
Udea uliginosalis (Stephens, 1834)
Udea zernyi (Klima, 1939)
Uresiphita gilvata (Fabricius, 1794)
Xanthocrambus caducellus (Muller-Rutz, 1909)
Xanthocrambus delicatellus (Zeller, 1863)

Douglasiidae
Klimeschia thymetella (Staudinger, 1859)
Klimeschia transversella (Zeller, 1839)
Tinagma balteolella (Fischer von Röslerstamm, 1841)
Tinagma ocnerostomella (Stainton, 1850)
Tinagma perdicella Zeller, 1839

Drepanidae
Achlya flavicornis (Linnaeus, 1758)
Cilix algirica Leraut, 2006
Cilix glaucata (Scopoli, 1763)
Cilix hispanica De-Gregorio, Torruella, Miret, Casas & Figueras, 2002
Cymatophorina diluta (Denis & Schiffermüller, 1775)
Drepana curvatula (Borkhausen, 1790)
Drepana falcataria (Linnaeus, 1758)
Falcaria lacertinaria (Linnaeus, 1758)
Habrosyne pyritoides (Hufnagel, 1766)
Ochropacha duplaris (Linnaeus, 1761)
Polyploca ridens (Fabricius, 1787)
Sabra harpagula (Esper, 1786)
Tethea ocularis (Linnaeus, 1767)
Tethea or (Denis & Schiffermüller, 1775)
Thyatira batis (Linnaeus, 1758)
Watsonalla binaria (Hufnagel, 1767)
Watsonalla cultraria (Fabricius, 1775)
Watsonalla uncinula (Borkhausen, 1790)

Elachistidae
Agonopterix adspersella (Kollar, 1832)
Agonopterix alstromeriana (Clerck, 1759)
Agonopterix arenella (Denis & Schiffermüller, 1775)
Agonopterix aspersella (Constant, 1888)
Agonopterix assimilella (Treitschke, 1832)
Agonopterix atomella (Denis & Schiffermüller, 1775)
Agonopterix cachritis (Staudinger, 1859)
Agonopterix capreolella (Zeller, 1839)
Agonopterix carduella (Hübner, 1817)
Agonopterix chironiella (Constant, 1893)
Agonopterix ciliella (Stainton, 1849)
Agonopterix cnicella (Treitschke, 1832)
Agonopterix curvipunctosa (Haworth, 1811)
Agonopterix ferulae (Zeller, 1847)
Agonopterix fruticosella (Walsingham, 1903)
Agonopterix heracliana (Linnaeus, 1758)
Agonopterix kaekeritziana (Linnaeus, 1767)
Agonopterix laterella (Denis & Schiffermüller, 1775)
Agonopterix liturosa (Haworth, 1811)
Agonopterix mendesi Corley, 2002
Agonopterix nanatella (Stainton, 1849)
Agonopterix nervosa (Haworth, 1811)
Agonopterix nodiflorella (Milliere, 1866)
Agonopterix ocellana (Fabricius, 1775)
Agonopterix oinochroa (Turati, 1879)
Agonopterix pallorella (Zeller, 1839)
Agonopterix perstrigella (Chrétien, 1925)
Agonopterix propinquella (Treitschke, 1835)
Agonopterix purpurea (Haworth, 1811)
Agonopterix rotundella (Douglas, 1846)
Agonopterix rutana (Fabricius, 1794)
Agonopterix scopariella (Heinemann, 1870)
Agonopterix selini (Heinemann, 1870)
Agonopterix senecionis (Nickerl, 1864)
Agonopterix squamosa (Mann, 1864)
Agonopterix straminella (Staudinger, 1859)
Agonopterix subpropinquella (Stainton, 1849)
Agonopterix thapsiella (Zeller, 1847)
Agonopterix umbellana (Fabricius, 1794)
Agonopterix vendettella (Chrétien, 1908)
Agonopterix yeatiana (Fabricius, 1781)
Anchinia cristalis (Scopoli, 1763)
Anchinia laureolella Herrich-Schäffer, 1854
Blastodacna atra (Haworth, 1828)
Blastodacna hellerella (Duponchel, 1838)
Cacochroa permixtella (Herrich-Schäffer, 1854)
Chrysoclista linneella (Clerck, 1759)
Chrysoclista splendida Karsholt, 1997
Depressaria adustatella Turati, 1927
Depressaria albipunctella (Denis & Schiffermüller, 1775)
Depressaria badiella (Hübner, 1796)
Depressaria beckmanni Heinemann, 1870
Depressaria cervicella Herrich-Schäffer, 1854
Depressaria chaerophylli Zeller, 1839
Depressaria cinderella Corley, 2002
Depressaria corticinella Zeller, 1854
Depressaria daucella (Denis & Schiffermüller, 1775)
Depressaria depressana (Fabricius, 1775)
Depressaria discipunctella Herrich-Schäffer, 1854
Depressaria douglasella Stainton, 1849
Depressaria eryngiella Milliere, 1881
Depressaria genistella Walsingham, 1903
Depressaria hofmanni Stainton, 1861
Depressaria incognitella Hannemann, 1990
Depressaria krasnowodskella Hannemann, 1953
Depressaria libanotidella Schlager, 1849
Depressaria marcella Rebel, 1901
Depressaria pimpinellae Zeller, 1839
Depressaria pulcherrimella Stainton, 1849
Depressaria radiella (Goeze, 1783)
Depressaria sordidatella Tengstrom, 1848
Depressaria tenebricosa Zeller, 1854
Depressaria ultimella Stainton, 1849
Depressaria ululana Rossler, 1866
Depressaria velox Staudinger, 1859
Depressaria veneficella Zeller, 1847
Depressaria erinaceella Staudinger, 1870
Depressaria hirtipalpis Zeller, 1854
Depressaria peniculatella Turati, 1922
Dystebenna stephensi (Stainton, 1849)
Elachista adscitella Stainton, 1851
Elachista amparoae Traugott-Olsen, 1992
Elachista anitella Traugott-Olsen, 1985
Elachista argentella (Clerck, 1759)
Elachista baldizzonella Traugott-Olsen, 1985
Elachista bazaella Traugott-Olsen, 1992
Elachista bazaensis Traugott-Olsen, 1990
Elachista bedellella (Sircom, 1848)
Elachista bengtssoni Traugott-Olsen, 1992
Elachista berndtiella Traugott-Olsen, 1985
Elachista catalana Parenti, 1978
Elachista catalunella Traugott-Olsen, 1992
Elachista chrysodesmella Zeller, 1850
Elachista cirrhoplica Kaila, 2012
Elachista collitella (Duponchel, 1843)
Elachista cuencaensis Traugott-Olsen, 1992
Elachista deceptricula Staudinger, 1880
Elachista disemiella Zeller, 1847
Elachista dispunctella (Duponchel, 1843)
Elachista fuscibasella Chrétien, 1915
Elachista galactitella (Eversmann, 1844)
Elachista gerdmaritella Traugott-Olsen, 1992
Elachista gielisi Traugott-Olsen, 1992
Elachista glaseri Traugott-Olsen, 1992
Elachista gormella Nielsen & Traugott-Olsen, 1987
Elachista hedemanni Rebel, 1899
Elachista heringi Rebel, 1899
Elachista hispanica Traugott-Olsen, 1992
Elachista istanella Nielsen & Traugott-Olsen, 1987
Elachista louiseae Traugott-Olsen, 1992
Elachista lugdunensis Frey, 1859
Elachista luqueti Traugott-Olsen, 1992
Elachista maboulella Chrétien, 1915
Elachista madridensis Traugott-Olsen, 1992
Elachista nevadensis Parenti, 1978
Elachista nuraghella Amsel, 1951
Elachista obliquella Stainton, 1854
Elachista occidentella Traugott-Olsen, 1992
Elachista oukaimedenensis Traugott-Olsen, 1988
Elachista passerini Traugott-Olsen, 1996
Elachista pollinariella Zeller, 1839
Elachista rikkeae Traugott-Olsen, 1992
Elachista squamosella (Duponchel, 1843)
Elachista subocellea (Stephens, 1834)
Elachista teruelensis Traugott-Olsen, 1990
Elachista totanaensis Traugott-Olsen, 1992
Elachista toveella Traugott-Olsen, 1985
Elachista tribertiella Traugott-Olsen, 1985
Elachista veletaella Traugott-Olsen, 1992
Elachista vivesi Traugott-Olsen, 1992
Elachista zuernbaueri Traugott-Olsen, 1990
Elachista alicanta Kaila, 2005
Elachista atricomella Stainton, 1849
Elachista biatomella (Stainton, 1848)
Elachista boursini Amsel, 1951
Elachista cinereopunctella (Haworth, 1828)
Elachista consortella Stainton, 1851
Elachista contaminatella Zeller, 1847
Elachista exactella (Herrich-Schäffer, 1855)
Elachista freyerella (Hübner, 1825)
Elachista geminatella (Herrich-Schäffer, 1855)
Elachista glaserella Traugott-Olsen, 2000
Elachista ibericella Traugott-Olsen, 1995
Elachista lastrella Chrétien, 1896
Elachista minuta (Parenti, 2003)
Elachista nevadella Traugott-Olsen, 2000
Elachista nobilella Zeller, 1839
Elachista pigerella (Herrich-Schäffer, 1854)
Elachista scirpi Stainton, 1887
Elachista stabilella Stainton, 1858
Elachista tetragonella (Herrich-Schäffer, 1855)
Elachista vulcana Kaila, 2011
Ethmia aurifluella (Hübner, 1810)
Ethmia bipunctella (Fabricius, 1775)
Ethmia candidella (Alphéraky, 1908)
Ethmia chrysopyga (Zeller, 1844)
Ethmia dodecea (Haworth, 1828)
Ethmia fumidella (Wocke, 1850)
Ethmia iranella Zerny, 1940
Ethmia lepidella (Chrétien, 1907)
Ethmia penyagolosella Domingo & Baixeras, 2003
Ethmia pusiella (Linnaeus, 1758)
Ethmia quadrillella (Goeze, 1783)
Ethmia terminella T. B. Fletcher, 1938
Exaeretia lutosella (Herrich-Schäffer, 1854)
Fuchsia huertasi Vives, 1995
Haplochrois albanica (Rebel & Zerny, 1932)
Haplochrois buvati (Baldizzone, 1985)
Haplochrois ochraceella (Rebel, 1903)
Heinemannia albidorsella (Staudinger, 1877)
Heinemannia festivella (Denis & Schiffermüller, 1775)
Hypercallia citrinalis (Scopoli, 1763)
Orophia denisella (Denis & Schiffermüller, 1775)
Orophia ferrugella (Denis & Schiffermüller, 1775)
Orophia sordidella (Hübner, 1796)
Perittia echiella (de Joannis, 1902)
Perittia granadensis (Traugott-Olsen, 1995)
Perittia piperatella (Staudinger, 1859)
Semioscopis steinkellneriana (Denis & Schiffermüller, 1775)
Spuleria flavicaput (Haworth, 1828)
Stephensia brunnichella (Linnaeus, 1767)
Stephensia calpella (Walsingham, 1908)
Stephensia unipunctella Nielsen & Traugott-Olsen, 1978

Endromidae
Endromis versicolora (Linnaeus, 1758)

Epermeniidae
Epermenia aequidentellus (E. Hofmann, 1867)
Epermenia chaerophyllella (Goeze, 1783)
Epermenia insecurella (Stainton, 1854)
Epermenia strictellus (Wocke, 1867)
Epermenia iniquellus (Wocke, 1867)
Epermenia ochreomaculellus (Milliere, 1854)
Epermenia pontificella (Hübner, 1796)
Epermenia scurella (Stainton, 1851)
Ochromolopis ictella (Hübner, 1813)
Ochromolopis staintonellus (Milliere, 1869)

Epipyropidae
Ommatissopyrops lusitanicus Bivar de Sousa & Quartau, 1998
Ommatissopyrops schawerdae (Zerny, 1929)

Erebidae
Albarracina warionis (Oberthur, 1881)
Amata phegea (Linnaeus, 1758)
Apaidia mesogona (Godart, 1824)
Apaidia rufeola (Rambur, 1832)
Apopestes spectrum (Esper, 1787)
Araeopteron ecphaea Hampson, 1914
Arctia caja (Linnaeus, 1758)
Arctia festiva (Hufnagel, 1766)
Arctia villica (Linnaeus, 1758)
Arctornis l-nigrum (Muller, 1764)
Artimelia latreillei (Godart, 1823)
Atlantarctia tigrina (Villers, 1789)
Atolmis rubricollis (Linnaeus, 1758)
Autophila dilucida (Hübner, 1808)
Autophila cataphanes (Hübner, 1813)
Callimorpha dominula (Linnaeus, 1758)
Calliteara pudibunda (Linnaeus, 1758)
Calyptra thalictri (Borkhausen, 1790)
Catephia alchymista (Denis & Schiffermüller, 1775)
Catocala coniuncta (Esper, 1787)
Catocala conversa (Esper, 1783)
Catocala dilecta (Hübner, 1808)
Catocala diversa (Geyer, 1828)
Catocala electa (Vieweg, 1790)
Catocala elocata (Esper, 1787)
Catocala fraxini (Linnaeus, 1758)
Catocala fulminea (Scopoli, 1763)
Catocala mariana Rambur, 1858
Catocala nupta (Linnaeus, 1767)
Catocala nymphaea (Esper, 1787)
Catocala nymphagoga (Esper, 1787)
Catocala oberthuri Austaut, 1879
Catocala optata (Godart, 1824)
Catocala promissa (Denis & Schiffermüller, 1775)
Catocala puerpera (Giorna, 1791)
Catocala sponsa (Linnaeus, 1767)
Cerocala scapulosa (Hübner, 1808)
Chelis maculosa (Gerning, 1780)
Clytie illunaris (Hübner, 1813)
Colobochyla salicalis (Denis & Schiffermüller, 1775)
Coscinia cribraria (Linnaeus, 1758)
Coscinia mariarosae Exposito, 1991
Coscinia romeii Sagarra, 1924
Coscinia striata (Linnaeus, 1758)
Cybosia mesomella (Linnaeus, 1758)
Cymbalophora pudica (Esper, 1785)
Diacrisia sannio (Linnaeus, 1758)
Diaphora mendica (Clerck, 1759)
Dicallomera fascelina (Linnaeus, 1758)
Drasteria cailino (Lefebvre, 1827)
Dysauxes ancilla (Linnaeus, 1767)
Dysauxes punctata (Fabricius, 1781)
Dysgonia algira (Linnaeus, 1767)
Dysgonia torrida (Guenée, 1852)
Eilema albicosta (Rogenhofer, 1894)
Eilema bipuncta (Hübner, 1824)
Eilema caniola (Hübner, 1808)
Eilema depressa (Esper, 1787)
Eilema griseola (Hübner, 1803)
Eilema interpositella Strand, 1920
Eilema lurideola (Zincken, 1817)
Eilema lutarella (Linnaeus, 1758)
Eilema marcida (Mann, 1859)
Eilema palliatella (Scopoli, 1763)
Eilema predotae (Schawerda, 1927)
Eilema pseudocomplana (Daniel, 1939)
Eilema pygmaeola (Doubleday, 1847)
Eilema rungsi Toulgoët, 1960
Eilema sororcula (Hufnagel, 1766)
Eilema uniola (Rambur, 1866)
Eublemma albida Duponchel, 1843
Eublemma amoena (Hübner, 1803)
Eublemma candicans (Rambur, 1858)
Eublemma candidana (Fabricius, 1794)
Eublemma cochylioides (Guenée, 1852)
Eublemma himmighoffeni (Milliere, 1867)
Eublemma minutata (Fabricius, 1794)
Eublemma ostrina (Hübner, 1808)
Eublemma parva (Hübner, 1808)
Eublemma polygramma (Duponchel, 1842)
Eublemma pura (Hübner, 1813)
Eublemma purpurina (Denis & Schiffermüller, 1775)
Eublemma rietzi Fibiger, Ronkay, Zilli & Yela, 2010
Eublemma rosea (Hübner, 1790)
Eublemma scitula Rambur, 1833
Euclidia mi (Clerck, 1759)
Euclidia glyphica (Linnaeus, 1758)
Euplagia quadripunctaria (Poda, 1761)
Euproctis chrysorrhoea (Linnaeus, 1758)
Euproctis similis (Fuessly, 1775)
Grammodes bifasciata (Petagna, 1787)
Grammodes stolida (Fabricius, 1775)
Herminia flavicrinalis (Andreas, 1910)
Herminia grisealis (Denis & Schiffermüller, 1775)
Herminia tarsicrinalis (Knoch, 1782)
Herminia tarsipennalis (Treitschke, 1835)
Hypena crassalis (Fabricius, 1787)
Hypena lividalis (Hübner, 1796)
Hypena obesalis Treitschke, 1829
Hypena obsitalis (Hübner, 1813)
Hypena proboscidalis (Linnaeus, 1758)
Hypena rostralis (Linnaeus, 1758)
Hyphoraia dejeani (Godart, 1822)
Hyphoraia testudinaria (Geoffroy in Fourcroy, 1785)
Idia calvaria (Denis & Schiffermüller, 1775)
Laelia coenosa (Hübner, 1808)
Laspeyria flexula (Denis & Schiffermüller, 1775)
Leucoma salicis (Linnaeus, 1758)
Lithosia quadra (Linnaeus, 1758)
Lygephila craccae (Denis & Schiffermüller, 1775)
Lygephila fonti Yela & Calle, 1990
Lygephila lusoria (Linnaeus, 1758)
Lygephila pastinum (Treitschke, 1826)
Lymantria atlantica (Rambur, 1837)
Lymantria dispar (Linnaeus, 1758)
Lymantria monacha (Linnaeus, 1758)
Macrochilo cribrumalis (Hübner, 1793)
Maurica breveti (Oberthur, 1882)
Metachrostis dardouini (Boisduval, 1840)
Metachrostis velox (Hübner, 1813)
Miltochrista miniata (Forster, 1771)
Minucia lunaris (Denis & Schiffermüller, 1775)
Nodaria nodosalis (Herrich-Schäffer, 1851)
Nudaria mundana (Linnaeus, 1761)
Ocneria rubea (Denis & Schiffermüller, 1775)
Ocnogyna baetica (Rambur, 1836)
Ocnogyna zoraida (Graslin, 1837)
Odice arcuinna (Hübner, 1790)
Odice blandula (Rambur, 1858)
Odice jucunda (Hübner, 1813)
Odice pergrata (Rambur, 1858)
Odice suava (Hübner, 1813)
Ophiusa tirhaca (Cramer, 1773)
Orgyia aurolimbata Guenée, 1835
Orgyia dubia (Tauscher, 1806)
Orgyia recens (Hübner, 1819)
Orgyia splendida Rambur, 1842
Orgyia trigotephras Boisduval, 1829
Orgyia antiqua (Linnaeus, 1758)
Paidia rica (Freyer, 1858)
Pandesma robusta (Walker, 1858)
Paracolax tristalis (Fabricius, 1794)
Parascotia fuliginaria (Linnaeus, 1761)
Parascotia lorai Agenjo, 1967
Parascotia nisseni Turati, 1905
Parasemia plantaginis (Linnaeus, 1758)
Pechipogo plumigeralis Hübner, 1825
Pechipogo simplicicornis (Zerny, 1935)
Pechipogo strigilata (Linnaeus, 1758)
Pelosia muscerda (Hufnagel, 1766)
Pelosia obtusa (Herrich-Schäffer, 1852)
Pelosia plumosa (Mabille, 1900)
Phragmatobia fuliginosa (Linnaeus, 1758)
Phragmatobia luctifera (Denis & Schiffermüller, 1775)
Phytometra sanctiflorentis (Boisduval, 1834)
Phytometra viridaria (Clerck, 1759)
Polypogon tentacularia (Linnaeus, 1758)
Raparna conicephala (Staudinger, 1870)
Rhypagla lacernaria (Hübner, 1813)
Rhyparia purpurata (Linnaeus, 1758)
Rivula sericealis (Scopoli, 1763)
Schrankia costaestrigalis (Stephens, 1834)
Scoliopteryx libatrix (Linnaeus, 1758)
Setina cantabrica de Freina & Witt, 1985
Setina flavicans (Geyer, 1836)
Spilosoma lubricipeda (Linnaeus, 1758)
Spilosoma lutea (Hufnagel, 1766)
Spilosoma urticae (Esper, 1789)
Tathorhynchus exsiccata (Lederer, 1855)
Thumatha senex (Hübner, 1808)
Trisateles emortualis (Denis & Schiffermüller, 1775)
Tyria jacobaeae (Linnaeus, 1758)
Utetheisa pulchella (Linnaeus, 1758)
Watsonarctia deserta (Bartel, 1902)
Zanclognatha lunalis (Scopoli, 1763)
Zanclognatha zelleralis (Wocke, 1850)
Zebeeba falsalis (Herrich-Schäffer, 1839)
Zethes insularis Rambur, 1833

Eriocottidae
Eriocottis andalusiella Rebel, 1901
Eriocottis hispanica Zagulajev, 1988
Eriocottis nicolaeella Gibeaux, 1983
Eriocottis paradoxella (Staudinger, 1859)

Eriocraniidae
Dyseriocrania subpurpurella (Haworth, 1828)
Eriocrania semipurpurella (Stephens, 1835)

Euteliidae
Eutelia adulatrix (Hübner, 1813)

See also
List of butterflies of the Iberian Peninsula

Sources
Fauna Europaea

Iberia
Iberia A
Moths
Moths
Moths